Euphaedra ochracea is a butterfly in the family Nymphalidae. It is found in the Democratic Republic of the Congo (Equateur, Sankuru and the north-eastern part of the country).

References

Butterflies described in 1980
ochracea
Endemic fauna of the Democratic Republic of the Congo
Butterflies of Africa